Brazilian coup d'état may refer to:

Proclamation of the Republic (Brazil)
1937 Brazilian coup d'état
1945 Brazilian coup d'état
1964 Brazilian coup d'état
2023 Brazilian Congress attack